Dawesville is a suburb of Mandurah, located adjacent to the Peel-Harvey Estuarine System south of Perth in Western Australia.  The Dawesville Cut, a man-made canal built in 1994, is to the north of the suburb.

Attractions outside crabbing and fishing include canoeing, jet-ski and skiing, whilst being only  from the beach over the highway is another attraction. 
Pyramids Beach, the most popular beach in Dawesville, is currently undergoing development of the beach to make it a future surf spot.

History
Dawesville is named after Louis Dawe who was involved in the local fish canning industry in the early 1900s. In 1913 Dawe built the heritage listed "Allandale Homestead" which overlooks the estuary.

References

Suburbs of Mandurah